Adolphe Rabinovitch (27 May 1918 – 1944), also known as Alec Rabinovitch, was a Special Operations Executive officer in France during the Second World War.  He rose to the rank of captain.

Life 
Born to a family of Jewish extraction in Russia and raised in Egypt, he studied in Paris and lived in the United States before the outbreak of the war. He was a junior wrestling and boxing champion in his youth, and has been described as a "giant of a man."

In 1939 he volunteered in the French Foreign Legion. He was taken prisoner by the Germans in June 1940 but escaped after three months. He then escaped to Britain via Spain and became an SOE agent. Rabinovitch was described by a trainer as argumentative and humourless, an "enigma."

He was first parachuted into France on 27/28 August 1942 north of Grenoble. He was dropped in the wrong place and became a radio operator for the SPINDLE network (codename "Arnaud"), with Peter Churchill and Odette Sansom, and managed to evade capture when that network collapsed.  With Victor Hazan (codename "Gervais"), he got back in contact with the network's contacts around Annecy and on the Côte d’Azur before returning to England via Spain.  There he became the assistant to Jean de Lattre de Tassigny before being parachuted back into France on the night of 2/3 March 1944 with Roméo Sabourin.  His orders were to set up and command the BARGEE network, but the landing site was under German control and he was wounded and captured as he landed. Because he was a Jew, he was deported to Gross-Rosen concentration camp in Poland, where he was gassed.

Peter Churchill dedicated his book Duel of Wits to "my beloved Arnaud, the late Captain Alec Rabinovitch, a violent, difficult, devoted and heroic radio operator, and through him to all 'underground' men and women of his supreme calibre who died, as they lived, in solitude. Their feats are legendary and beyond all military awards."

In the 1950 British film Odette he is played by Peter Ustinov.

Recognition

Distinctions 
 UK: Mentioned in Despatches.
 France : Croix de guerre 1939–1945 with Étoile de Vermeil.

Monuments 
 His name is on the SOE memorial at Valençay, Indre, France.
 Brookwood Memorial, Surrey, panel 21, column 3.

Notes

References
 Churchill, Peter, Duel of Wits, New York, G.P. Putnam's Sons, U.S. edition (combining British editions of Duel of Wits and Of Their Own Choice), 1955. 
Loftis, Larry (2019). Code name: Lise: The True Story of World War II's Most Highly Decorated Spy (Hardcover ed.). New York: Gallery Books. .
 Michael Richard Daniell Foot, SOE in France. An account of the Work of the British Special Operations Executive in France, 1940–1944, London, Her Majesty's Stationery Office, 1966, 1968; Whitehall History Publishing, in association with Frank Cass, 2004.

1918 births
1944 deaths
Egyptian Ashkenazi Jews
Russian Jews
Special Operations Executive personnel killed in World War II
Soldiers of the French Foreign Legion
People who died in Gross-Rosen concentration camp
Recipients of the Croix de Guerre 1939–1945 (France)
Soviet emigrants to Egypt
Military personnel who died in the Holocaust
French Jewish military personnel
French Jews who died in the Holocaust
French military personnel of World War II
Egyptian expatriates in the United States
Egyptian emigrants to France
British Army General List officers
British Army personnel killed in World War II